Scottish toponymy derives from the languages of Scotland. The toponymy varies in each region, reflecting the linguistic history of each part of the country.

Goidelic roots accounts for most place-names in eastern Scotland, with a few Anglic names in Fife and Angus and with a small number Pictish elements assimilated into the total toponymy.

Nearly every place-name in the Northern Isles has Norse roots (see Norn language and Scandinavian toponymy), as do many in the Western Isles and along the coasts of the mainland.

In the highlands, the names are primarily from Scottish Gaelic, with emphasis on natural features; elements such as Glen- (Gaelic: , valley) and Inver- (Gaelic: , confluence, mouth) are common.

In lowland Scotland, names are of more diverse origin. Many are Gaelic, but many also derive from the Brythonic branch of Celtic languages (such as Lanark). There are also a substantial number of place names, particularly in the east lowlands, derived from the northern dialect of Old English (see Northumbrian language) and later Scots. For example, -dale as used in e.g. Tweeddale, is from Old English.

Places in Scotland where the Gaelic and English placenames appear to differ
This is a list of names which are not cognate, i.e. they are not from the same root or origins. Some names which appear unrelated in fact are; for example the name Falkirk ultimately derives from a calque (i.e. a word-for-word translation) of its Gaelic name  (literally 'the speckled/variegated church').

See also

Acarsaid
Ainmean-Àite na h-Alba
Albania (placename)
Celtic onomastics
Celtic toponymy 
Dun
Etymology of Aberdeen
Etymology of Edinburgh
Etymology of Scotland
Etymology of Skye
Geography of Scotland
History of Scotland
Irish toponymy
List of places in Scotland
List of Scottish Gaelic place names
Scottish Gaelic personal naming system
Scottish place names in other countries
Scottish Place-Name Society
Shieling
Toponymy in the United Kingdom and Ireland
Welsh toponymy

References

Further reading
 
 
 
 

 

Scottish
Geography of Scotland
Scottish culture